El Dorado Airport is the main airport in Bogotá, Colombia

El Dorado Airport or Eldorado Airport may also refer to:

El Dorado Airport (Argentina) in Eldorado, Misiones, Argentina
El Dorado Airport (Bolivia) in El Dorado, La Paz Department, Bolivia
Captain Jack Thomas/El Dorado Airport in El Dorado, Kansas, United States
South Arkansas Regional Airport at Goodwin Field in El Dorado, Arkansas, United States
Eldorado Airport (Texas) outside Eldorado, Texas, United States
El Dorado Airport (Venezuela) in El Dorado, Venezuela